Liamine Zéroual ( ALA-LC: al-Yamīn Zarwāl; Berber: Lyamin Ẓerwal; born 3 July 1941) is an Algerian politician who was the sixth President of Algeria from 31 January 1994 to 27 April 1999.

Biography
He was born in Batna and joined the National Liberation Army in 1957, at the age of 16, to fight French rule of Algeria. After independence, he received training in Cairo, Egypt, then Moscow, Soviet Union (1965-1966) and finally Paris. In 1975, he took command of a military school in Batna, then in 1981 of the Cherchell Military Academy. He was then made commander of the Tamanrasset military region in 1982, then the 3rd Military Region on the Moroccan border in 1984, then that of Constantine in 1987. He became a general in 1988, then head of ground forces in 1989.

After disagreeing with President Chadli Bendjedid about proposals for army reorganisation, he left the ANP in 1989, and briefly became ambassador to Romania. However, after Bendjedid's forced resignation in January 1992, his career prospects became more promising. In July 1993, he became Minister of Defense; in January 1994 he was promoted to head of the High Council of State. In November 1995, he was elected President, a post which he retained until the next elections. He was reputed to be politically dialoguist, supporting a partly negotiated solution to the Algerian Civil War. On December 25, 1994, Zéroual reluctantly allowed hijacked Air France Flight 8969 to leave Algerian territory after 3 civilians, including a French embassy chef, were murdered by the four hijackers.

Although some urged Zéroual to run in the 2009 presidential election, he said in a published statement on 14 January 2009 that he would not run, while also suggesting that it was not in the best interests of democracy for President Abdelaziz Bouteflika to run for a third term.

Honours

National honour
  Grand Master of the National Order of Merit

References

External links

MEDEA: Liamine Zeroual

1941 births
People from Batna, Algeria
Chaoui people
Algerian Berber politicians
Algerian generals
Presidents of Algeria
Defense ministers of Algeria
Ambassadors of Algeria to Romania
Living people
21st-century Algerian people